Bear (or Bere) is a barony in the most westerly part of County Cork, Ireland. It comprises approximately two thirds of the Beara peninsula from the western tip along the whole northern shore part of Bantry bay to Glengariff. The remaining third to the north-east is the neighbouring barony of Glanarought in County Kerry. The barony's only other neighbour is that of Bantry to the east. To the north, it is bounded by  the Kenmare River

Legal context
Baronies were created after the Norman invasion of Ireland as divisions of counties and were used the administration of justice and the raising of revenue. While baronies continue to be officially defined units, they have been administratively obsolete since 1898. However, they continue to be used in land registration and in specification, such as in planning permissions. In many cases, a barony corresponds to an earlier Gaelic túath which had submitted to the Crown.

Settlements
It induces the town of Castletownbere and settlements of Allihies, Eyeries, Ardgroom, Adrigole, Glengarriff and Rerrin.

Civil parishes
The barony includes the whole of three civil parishes (Kilcatherine, Killaconenagh and Kilnamanagh) and part of a fourth (Kilcaskan).

Geography
Garnish Island  
Hungry Hill 
Dursey Island
Bere Island

References

Baronies of County Cork
Beara peninsula